Norröna is the Faroes' largest ferry. It sails between Hirtshals, Denmark to Tórshavn, the Faroe Islands and Seyðisfjörður, Iceland.

History

Norröna (1973)

The old Norröna was built in 1973 at Nobiskrug in Rendsburg in Germany as Gustav Wasa. From 1984 she was called the Norröna and sailed for the owner Smyril Line between Denmark, the Faroe Islands, Iceland and Norway, and in some years Shetland also. The successor is the new Norröna (from 2003). But the old ship is still sailing under the flag of Malta, as a missionary ship under the name MV Logos Hope.

Norröna (2003)

The new Norröna is a modern cruiseferry. It was built in Lübeck, Germany, and had its maiden voyage in April 2003. She has a total of 318 passenger cabins and 72 crew cabins, which accommodates the space of approximately 1,482 passengers and 118 crew members. Norröna is the only way to take personal cars to the Faroe Islands and Iceland from Denmark or from the Faroe Islands and Iceland to Denmark.

For passengers the ship is equipped with restaurants, a swimming pool, a small cinema and a fitness centre. Room types include cabins for two, cabins for families, connecting cabins, single berths in a four-person cabin and a dorm-style space with shared bathroom. The ferry also sails in the winter months, but there are few tourists on these trips and therefore only a crew of 20–25 is needed. In the winter months the ferry also changes from being a luxury ship to be more of a container ship.

The ferry observes ocean currents and water properties in the North Sea, the Faroe-Shetland Channel and the Iceland-Faroe Ridge for the American Geophysical Union.

The new Norröna cost about 100 million Euro, which nearly broke Smyril, and gave some financial difficulties, but with public support guaranteed the Norröna remains a Faroese ship.

Alternative routes
The ferry has visited Newcastle upon Tyne, England, as a Christmas shopping special, allowing visitors a day in the city.

When the weather is bad on the Faroe Islands, the ship may dock at the alternative ports of Klaksvík or Runavík instead of Tórshavn.

Accidents
In January 2004 there was an accident with the new Norröna in Tórshavn, when the ferry hit the wharf and suffered slight damage.

In November 2007 the Norröna lost power in heavy seas near the Shetland Islands;  the ferry began to roll and eighty cars were damaged on the car deck. The ship was forced to stop at Lerwick for emergency repairs to the heavily damaged stabilisers.

In popular culture
Norröna plays a major part in the 2015 Icelandic mystery television series Trapped

She was featured in detail in the documentary television programme Mighty Ships, on the Discovery channel in some countries and on other networks in others. The episode first aired in early December 2017 in Canada. The series is said to be available in over 150 countries.

References

External links

 Smyril Line

2002 ships
Ferries of the Faroe Islands
Cruiseferries
Transport in Shetland